The Kevin Kline Awards were started in 2006, to recognize outstanding achievement in professional theatre in the Greater St. Louis area. The awards are sponsored by PTAC, the Professional Theatre Awards Council, and were named in honor of Kevin Kline, a St. Louis native who has been the recipient of both Tony and Academy Awards.

Eligibility and judging
In order for a play to be considered for a Kevin Kline Award, it must:
 Be produced within the St. Louis metro area
 Include at least six performances
 Have paid those who work on the show, including both actors and crew

Each nominee is reviewed by seven judges, who are drawn randomly from a pool of 49. Judges then give each production a numerical rating on each of the available categories (acting, directing, lighting, etc.) and submit their ballot within 24 hours of seeing the production. At the end of each year, the five productions with the highest score in each category are listed as the nominees, and the award goes to the one with the best score:

The first award ceremony was held on March 20, 2006, in the Roberts Orpheum Theatre, and hosted by St. Louis-native Broadway actor Jason Danieley. Presenters included Kline, and St. Louis-born Broadway actor Ken Page. Kline received the first-ever Kevin Kline Award to be created, and was also told at the performance about the creation of the Kevin Kline Theater Ticket Fund, which will provide free tickets to area high school students.

The Kevin Kline Awards were suspended in June 2012 due to financial concerns.

2006 Awards

Outstanding Production of a Musical
 West Side Story, The MunyOutstanding Production of a Play
 Take Me Out, The Repertory Theatre of St. LouisOutstanding Director of a Musical
 Kevin Backstrom, West Side Story, The Muny Michael Hamilton, Footloose, Stages St. LouisOutstanding Director of a Play
 Rob Ruggiero, Take Me Out, The Repertory Theatre of St. LouisOutstanding Musical Direction
 Kelsey Halbert, West Side Story, The MunyOutstanding Choreography
 Dana Lewis, Footloose, Stages St. LouisOutstanding Costume Design
 Reggie Ray, Crowns, The Repertory Theatre of St. LouisOutstanding Lighting Design
 John Lasiter, Take Me Out, The Repertory Theatre of St. LouisOutstanding Set Design
 Christopher Pickart, The Tempest, Shakespeare Festival St. LouisOutstanding Sound Design
 Ann Slayton & Robin Weatherall, The Tempest, Shakespeare Festival St. LouisOutstanding New Play or Musical
 The Ensemble, So to Speak, Washington Avenue Players ProjectOutstanding Ensemble in a Play
 Going to See the Elephant, Orange GirlsOutstanding Ensemble in a Musical
 West Side Story, The MunyOutstanding Lead Actor in a Musical
 Ben Nordstrom, Footloose, Stages St. LouisOutstanding Lead Actor in a Play
 Nat DeWolf, Take Me Out, The Repertory Theatre of St. LouisOutstanding Lead Actress in a Musical
  Zoe Vonder Haar, Hello, Dolly!, Stages St. LouisOutstanding Lead Actress in a Play
 Michelle Hand, Separate Tables, Act Inc. Nancy Lewis, Going to See the Elephant, Orange GirlsOutstanding Supporting Actor in a Musical
 Ken Page, Jesus Christ Superstar, The MunyOutstanding Supporting Actor in a Play
 Gary Wayne Barker, Driving Miss Daisy, New Jewish TheatreOutstanding Supporting Actress in a Musical
 Natascia Diaz, West Side Story, The MunyOutstanding Supporting Actress in a Play
 Brooke Edwards, Going to See the Elephant, Orange GirlsOutstanding Production for Young Audiences
 Bah! Humbug!, The Imaginary Theatre Company/The Repertory Theatre of St. Louis2011 AwardsOutstanding Production for Young Audiences: Tie: Delilah’s Wish (Metro Theatre Company)
Tie: The Aristocats (Stages St. Louis)
A Peter Rabbit Tale (The Rep’s Imaginary Theatre Company)
Amelia Earhart (The Rep’s Imaginary Theatre Company)
The Nutcracker (The Rep’s Imaginary Theatre Company)Outstanding New Play or Musical: David Slavitt, translator (Oedipus King, Upstream Theater)
Jami Brandli (The Sinker, HotCity Theatre)
Lee Patton Chiles (Eye on the Sparrow: The World Within St. Louis, Gitana Productions)
Sandra Marie Vago (Treading Backward Thru Quicksand Without Wearing Your Water Wings, Black Cat Theatre)Outstanding Costume Design: John Inchiostro (The Aristocats, Stages St. Louis)
JC Krajicek (Tartuffe, Mustard Seed)
Dorothy Marshall Englis (Hamlet, Shakespeare Festival St. Louis)
JC Krajicek (Crumbs From the Table of Joy, Mustard Seed Theatre)
Jess Goldstein (High, The Repertory Theatre of St. Louis)Outstanding Lighting Design: John Lasiter (High, The Repertory Theatre of St. Louis)
Brian Sidney Bembridge (Crime and Punishment, The Repertory Theatre of St. Louis)
Matthew McCarthy (Big River, Stages St. Louis)
Matthew McCarthy (Promises, Promises, Stages St. Louis)Outstanding Set Design: David Gallo (High, The Repertory Theatre of St. Louis)
Gianni Downs (Crime and Punishment, The Repertory Theatre of St. Louis)
Christopher M. Waller (It Had to be You, Max and Louie Productions)
Mark Halpin (Promises, Promises, Stages St. Louis)
Michael Heil (Oedipus King, Upstream Theater)Outstanding Sound Design: Tie: Josh Limpert (Outlying Islands, Upstream Theater)
Tie: Ann Slayton and Robin Weatherall (Hamlet, Shakespeare Festival St. Louis)
Tie: Matthew Koch (Slasher, HotCity Theatre)
Mic Pool (The 39 Steps, The Repertory Theatre of St. Louis)Outstanding Ensemble in a Play: The Chosen (Mustard Seed Theatre)
The 39 Steps (The Repertory Theatre of St. Louis)
Outlying Islands (Upstream Theater)
Hamlet (Shakespeare Festival St. Louis)
High (The Repertory Theatre of St. Louis)Outstanding Supporting Actress in a Play: Kari Ely (Why Torture is Wrong, and The People Who Love Them, HotCity Theatre)
Kimiye Corwin (Hamlet, Shakespeare Festival of St. Louis)
Colleen Backer (Our Town, Stray Dog Theatre)
Patrese McClain (Crumbs From the Table of Joy, Mustard Seed Theatre)
Kelley Ryan (Equus, HotCity Theatre)
Betsy Bowman (The Tempest, Shakespeare Company of St. Louis)
Susan Greenhill (Next Fall, The Repertory Theatre of St. Louis)Outstanding Supporting Actor in a Play: Evan Jonigkeit (High, The Repertory Theatre of St. Louis)
Jerry Vogel (Outlying Islands, Upstream Theater)
Bobby Miller (Laughter on the 23rd Floor, New Jewish Theatre)
Richard Lewis (The Chosen, Mustard Seed Theatre)
Aaron Orion Baker (Long Day’s Journey Into Night, Muddy Waters)Outstanding Lead Actress in a Play: Kari Ely (Long Day’s Journey Into Night, Muddy Waters)
Michelle Hand (Fires in the Mirror, Mustard Seed Theatre)
Magan Wiles (My Name is Rachel Corrie, Blue Rose Stage Collective)
Kathleen Turner (High, The Repertory Theatre of St. Louis)Outstanding Lead Actor in a Play: Jim Butz (Hamlet, Shakespeare Festival St. Louis)
Jason Cannon (Outlying Islands, Upstream Theater)
Scott McMaster (Outlying Islands, Upstream Theater)
Drew Pannebacker (Equus, HotCity Theatre)
Alan Knoll (This Wonderful Life, Dramatic License Productions)Outstanding Director of a Play: Philip Boehm (Outlying Islands, Upstream Theater)
Bruce Longworth (Hamlet, Shakespeare Festival St. Louis)
Doug Finlayson (Equus, HotCity Theatre)
Philip Boehm (Oedipus King, Upstream Theater)
Rob Ruggiero (High, The Repertory Theatre of St. Louis)
Deanna Jent (The Chosen, Mustard Seed Theatre)Outstanding Production of a Play: Hamlet (Shakespeare Festival St. Louis)
Outlying Islands (Upstream Theater)
High (The Repertory Theatre of St. Louis)
The Chosen (Mustard Seed Theatre)Outstanding Director of Musical: Michael Hamilton (Promises, Promises, Stages St. Louis)
Ron Himes (Five Guys Named Moe, The Black Rep)
Paul Blake (Damn Yankees, The Muny)
Marc Bruni (Sound of Music, The Muny)
Edward Coffield (Man of La Mancha, Insight)Outstanding Choreography: Mary MacLeod (Damn Yankees, The Muny)
Lazette Rayford-O’Brien (Five Guys Named Moe, The Black Rep)
Heather Beal (The Me Nobody Knows, The Black Rep)
Suzanne Viverito (Cats, The Muny)Outstanding Ensemble in a Musical: Five Guys Named Moe (The Black Rep)
The Wild Party (New Line)
Damn Yankees (The Muny)
Cats (The Muny)
Aristocats (Stages St. Louis)
Show Boat (The Muny)
State Fair (Stages St. Louis)
Last of the Red Hot Mamas (New Jewish Theatre)Outstanding Supporting Actress in a Musical: Brandi Wooten (Promises, Promises, Stages St. Louis)
Sharisa Whatley (The Me Nobody Knows, The Black Rep)
Jo Ann Hawkins White (Show Boat, The Muny)
Johanna Elkana-Hale (Last of the Red Hot Mamas, New Jewish Theatre)Outstanding Supporting Actor in a Musical''': Michel Bell (Show Boat, The Muny)
Joneal Joplin (The Fantasticks, The Repertory Theatre of St. Louis)
Lara Teeter (Beauty and the Beast, The Muny)
Kevin Loreque (Cats, The Muny)Outstanding Lead Actress in a Musical: Ashley Brown (The Sound of Music, The Muny)
Vanessa Rubin (Yesterdays: An evening with Billie Holiday, The Black Rep)
Stephanie J. Block (Cats, The Muny)
Leah Horowitz (Show Boat, The Muny)
Hollie Howard (State Fair, Stages St. Louis)
Outstanding Lead Actor in a Musical: Ben Nordstrom (Promises, Promises, Stages St. Louis)
Ben Nordstrom (Gutenberg! The Musical!, Temporary Theatre)
John Sparger (Pump Boys and Dinettes, Bear Stage)
Jeffrey Pruett (The Wild Party, New Line)
Eric Kunze (Damn Yankees, The Muny)
Outstanding Musical Direction: Charles Creath (Five Guys Named Moe, The Black Rep)
Sallie duMaine (Pump Boys and Dinettes, Bear Stage)
Michael Horsley (Damn Yankees, The Muny)
Lisa Campbell Albert (Promises, Promises, Stages St. Louis)
Ben Whiteley (Sound of Music, The Muny)
Catherine Matejka (Show Boat, The Muny)
Henry Palkes (Last of the Red Hot Mamas, New Jewish Theatre)
Outstanding Production of a Musical: Show Boat (The Muny)
Five Guys Named Moe (The Black Rep)
Big River (Stages St. Louis)
Damn Yankees (The Muny)
Promises, Promises (Stages St. Louis)
Sound of Music (The Muny)
State Fair (Stages St. Louis)

2012 Awards

 Outstanding Production for Young Audiences: The Giver, Metro Theater Company and Edison Theatre
Chanticleer!, The Repertory Theatre of St. Louis/Imaginary Theatre Company
Trail of Tears, The Repertory Theatre of St. Louis/Imaginary Theatre Company
Cruel to be Kind?, Shakespeare Festival Education Tour
Elves and the Shoemaker, The Repertory Theatre of St. Louis/Imaginary Theatre Company
Outstanding New Play or Musical: Deanna Jent, Falling, Mustard Seed Theatre
Deanna Jent, Till We Have Faces, Mustard Seed Theatre
Samm Art-Williams, The Montford Point Marine, The Black Rep
David L. Williams, The Winners, HotCity Theatre
Carter Lewis, Hit-Story, OnSite Theatre
Lucia Laragione, English translation byPhilip Boehm, Cooking With Elisa, Upstream Theater
Outstanding Costume Design: Dorothy Marshall Englis, The Secret Garden, Stages St. Louis
Dorothy Marshall Englis, The Vibrator Play, The Repertory Theatre of St. Louis
Garth Dunbar, Awake and Sing!, The New Jewish Theatre
Michele Siler, The Death of Atahualpa, Upstream Theater
Brad Muskgrove, Disney’s 101 Dalmatians, Stages St. Louis
Teresa Doggett, The Royal Family, Act Inc.
Lou Bird, Victor/Victoria, Stages St. Louis
JC Krajicek, Palmer Park, St. Louis Actors’ Studio
Outstanding Lighting Design: Robert M. Wierzel, The Adventures of Tom Sawyer, The Repertory Theatre of St. Louis
Josh Smith, The Immigrant, The New Jewish Theatre
Matthew McCarthy, The Secret Garden, Stages St. Louis
Phil Monat, Red, The Repertory Theatre of St. Louis
Matthew McCarthy, Victor/Victoria, Stages St. Louis
Kirk Bookman & Steve O’Shea, God of Carnage, The Repertory Theatre of St. Louis
Outstanding Set Design: *Tie: Gianni Downs, The Vibrator Play, The Repertory Theatre of St. Louis
Tie: Scott C. Neale, Awake and Sing!, The New Jewish Theatre
Tie: Michael Ganio, Red, The Repertory Theatre of St. Louis
Scott C. Neale, Cooking With Elisa, Upstream Theater
Regina Garcia, Ruined, The Black Rep
Scott C. Neale, The Taming of the Shrew, Shakespeare Festival St. Louis
Outstanding Sound Design: Daniel Baker & Aaron Meicht, The Adventures of Tom Sawyer, The Repertory Theatre of St. Louis
Rusty Wandall, Macbeth, The Repertory Theatre of St. Louis
Josh Limpert, The Immigrant, The New Jewish Theatre
Rusty Wandall, Red, The Repertory Theatre of St. Louis
Rusty Wandall, Circle Mirror Transformation, The Repertory Theatre of St. Louis
Outstanding Ensemble Play: Tie: The Immigrant, The New Jewish Theatre
Tie: Circle Mirror Transformation, The Repertory Theatre of St. Louis
The Vibrator Play, The Repertory Theatre of St. Louis
The Real McCoy, The Black Rep
The Adventures of Tom Sawyer, The Repertory Theatre of St. Louis
Outstanding Supporting Actress in a Play: Peggy Billo, The Immigrant, The New Jewish Theatre
Linda Kennedy, Pericles, The Black Rep
Emily Baker, Just Desserts, St. Louis Actors' Studio
Julie Venegoni, Savage in Limbo, OnSite Theatre
Linda Kennedy, Blood Wedding, Upstream Theater
Hayley Treide, The Adventures of Tom Sawyer, The Repertory Theatre of St. Louis
Outstanding Supporting Actor in a Play: Gary Wayne Barker, The Immigrant, The New Jewish Theatre
Bob Harvey, The Price, Avalon Theatre Company
Chauncy Thomas, The Real McCoy, The Black Rep
Jason Cannon, Awake and Sing!, The New Jewish Theatre
Jonathan Foster, Falling, Mustard Seed Theatre
Outstanding Lead Actress in a Play: Brooke Edwards, Danny and the Deep Blue Sea, The Non-Prophet Theatre Company
Andrea Frye, Ruined, The Black Rep
Kari Ely, Sirens, The New Jewish Theatre
Michelle Hand, Falling, Mustard Seed Theatre
Susan Louise O’Connor, God of Carnage, The Repertory Theatre of St. Louis
 

Outstanding Lead Actor in a Play: Bob Thibaut, The Immigrant, The New Jewish Theatre
Gary Barker, Shadowlands, Mustard Seed Theatre
J. Samuel Davis, Ruined, The Black Rep
John Pierson, Closer, St. Louis Actors' Studio
Bobby Miller, Awake and Sing!, The New Jewish Theatre
Brian Dykstra, Red, The Repertory Theatre of St. Louis
Danny McCarthy, Circle Mirror Transformation, The Repertory Theatre of St. Louis
Outstanding Director of a Play: Steven Woolf, Red, The Repertory Theatre of St. Louis
Andrew Moodie, The Real McCoy, The Black Rep
Edward Coffield, The Immigrant, The New Jewish Theatre
Stuart Carden, Circle Mirror Transformation, The Repertory Theatre of St. Louis
Jeremy B. Cohen, The Adventures of Tom Sawyer, The Repertory Theatre of St. Louis
Outstanding Production of a Play: Tie: Red, The Repertory Theatre of St. Louis
Tie: Awake and Sing!, The New Jewish Theatre
The Vibrator Play, The Repertory Theatre of St. Louis
The Immigrant, The New Jewish Theatre
God of Carnage, The Repertory Theatre of St. Louis
Circle Mirror Transformation, The Repertory Theatre of St. Louis
Outstanding Musical Direction: Tie: Lisa Campbell-Albert, The Secret Garden, Stages St. Louis
Tie: Joe Schoen, Godspell, Mustard Seed Theatre
Michael Sebastian, Beehive, The Repertory Theatre of St. Louis
Charles Creath, Black Pearl Sings!, The Black Rep
Michael Horsley, Seven Brides for Seven Brothers, The Muny
Outstanding Choreography: Pepper Clyde, Seven Brides for Seven Brothers, The Muny
Kelli Barclay, Singin’ in the Rain, The Muny
Dana Lewis, The Secret Garden, Stages St. Louis
Dana Lewis, Victor/Victoria, Stages St. Louis
Alicia Gbaho, Black Nativity, The Black Rep
Outstanding Ensemble in a Musical: Seven Brides for Seven Brothers, The Muny
Beehive, The Repertory Theatre of St. Louis
Legally Blonde, The Muny
Singin’ in the Rain, The Muny
Godspell, Mustard Seed Theatre
Outstanding Supporting Actress in a Musical: Melinda Crown, Victor/Victoria, Stages St. Louis
Jessica Vaccaro, A Chorus Line, Stages St. Louis
Michele Ragusa, Singin’ in the Rain, The Muny
Julia Cardia, The Secret Garden, Stages St. Louis
Amy Loui, Godspell, Mustard Seed Theatre
Outstanding Supporting Actor in a Musical: Curtis Holbrook, Singin’ in the Rain, The Muny
Ken Page, Little Shop of Horrors, The Muny
Lewis J. Stadlen, Bye Bye Birdie, The Muny
Steve Judkins, Victor/Victoria, Stages St. Louis
Outstanding Lead Actress in a Musical: Alexis Kinney, The Secret Garden, Stages St. Louis
Lisa Estridge, Beehive, The Repertory Theatre of St. Louis
Debra Walton, Beehive, The Repertory Theatre of St. Louis
Denise Thimes, Black Pearl Sings!, The Black Rep
Alli Mauzey, Little Shop of Horrors, The Muny
Jenny Powers, Seven Brides for Seven Brothers, The Muny
Outstanding Lead Actor in a Musical: Leigh Wakeford, Disney’s 101 Dalmatians, Stages St. Louis
Tony Yazbeck, Singin’ in the Rain, The Muny
James Bleecker, Thrill Me, Max & Louie Productions
David Schmittou, Victor/Victoria, Stages St. Louis
Outstanding Director of a Musical: Deanna Jent, Godspell, Mustard Seed Theatre
Andrea Frye, Black Pearl Sings!, The Black Rep
Rick Conant, Singin’ in the Rain, The Muny
John Miller-Stephany, Little Shop of Horrors, The Muny
Mark Schneider, Seven Brides for Seven Brothers, The Muny
Outstanding Production of a Musical: Singin’ in the Rain, The Muny
The Secret Garden, Stages St. Louis
Seven Brides for Seven Brothers, The Muny
Victor/Victoria, Stages St. Louis
Godspell, Mustard Seed Theatre

References

External links
 Official website
 2007 nominees and recipients (.doc file)
 2006 nominees and recipients
 "Best of St. Louis Theatre Honored at March 20 Kevin Kline Awards", March 17, 2006, Playbill''
 Jim Campbell, March 20, 2006, PLAYBACK:stl
 http://www.broadwayworld.com/viewcolumn.cfm?colid=8388
 https://archive.today/20130126071352/http://www.hollywood.com/celebrity/Kevin_Kline/195578
 http://www.riverfronttimes.com/2005-12-14/culture/great-expectations/

Awards established in 2006
Culture of St. Louis
American theater awards